Eretmocera monophaea is a moth of the family Scythrididae. It was described by Edward Meyrick in 1927. It is found in Namibia and South Africa (KwaZulu-Natal).

The wingspan is about 10 mm. The forewings are dark fuscous, suffusedly and irregularly clouded grey with a faint pinkish tinge, sometimes with a whitish spot on the costa al three-fourths and with some whitish scales near the apex. The hindwings are grey.

References

monophaea
Moths described in 1927